A One is the sixteenth full-length studio album recorded by Japanese singer Ayumi Hamasaki. It was released on April 8, 2015 (exactly 17 years after her debut) by Avex Trax.  It reached #4 on the Oricon charts.

Background and promotion
On December 24, 2014, Hamasaki released a triple A-side single "Zutto.../Last Minute/Walk". The single consisted of a "winter ballad trilogy" that included three songs composed by Kunio Tago, Tetsuya Yukumi, Tetsuya Komuro. In February 2015, Hamasaki announced through her official website that she was going to release a new album on April 8, 2015, which marked the 17th anniversary since the release of her debut single, "Poker Face".

In March 2015, Hamasaki went to Singapore, where she sang her new song "The Gift" in collaboration with singer-songwriter JJ Lin.

Upon release, it entered the Oricon album chart at number 4 for the week of April 20.

Track listing

Personnel 
Credits for A One adapted from liner notes.

Mastered by - Shigeo Minamoto
Recorded by Naoki Yamada, Yuichi Nagayama, Hiroshi Sato, Hideaki Jinbu
Second Engineers: Yujiro Yonetsu, Yutaro Wada, Atsushi Ohta, Junichi Shinohara, Motohiro Noguchi
Composer Management - Tomonori Takeda, Tadayoshi Matsuzaka, Yuki Iwabuchi, Kohji Satoh
Engineer Management - Rieko Furukawa
Studio Coordination in LA - Mai Takamizawa
Studio Setup Assistant - Noriko Yajima
Players and Studio Coordination - Yoji Sugiyama
Track 9 Support - Alvin Goh, Shinji Miyazaki (Avex Taiwan Inc.), Tomoko Kabeya (Avex Group Holdings Inc.)
Track 12 Support - Hidenobu Okita, Nozomu Kaji (Universal Music)
Director - Hidetomo "Kome" Yoneda
A&R - Jiro Nakagiri
General Supervisor - Shintaro Higuchi, Hiroaki Ito
Executive Supervisor - Shinji Hayashi, Shigekazu Takeuchi, Ryuhei Chiba
Photographer - Akinori Ito
Art Direction & Design - Takuma Noriage

Charts

References 

2015 albums
Ayumi Hamasaki albums
Japanese-language albums